The Gardener of God is a 2013 Italian drama film written and directed by Liana Marabini in 2010, about the life and works of Gregor Mendel, a Catholic priest who lived in the Austro-Hungarian Empire. The main role is played by Christopher Lambert.

Plot
The film shows the life and works of Gregor Mendel, the father of modern genetics, from the perspective of a scientific monk, a man of prayer, faith and science. The decor is the 19th century Austro-Hungarian Empire. We see Mendel's fight to change the fiscal policies applied to the monasteries of his country, as well as his struggles to change people's mind regarding his great discovery. Mendel will ask himself if it is possible to reconcile faith and science, and if his discovery will be useful for humanity or dangerous, as it could be used for eugenics purposes. In that sense, his benefactor and friend, the princess Hanna von Limburg, will be of a great help. Mendel finally publishes his conclusions, and goes to the Vatican meet the Pope, who welcomes his works.

Cast
 Christopher Lambert as Gregor Mendel
 David Wayne Callahan as Marquis Giovanni Sala Amorini
 Steven Cree as The Rabbi
 Daniela Di Muro as Federica Salina Amorini
 Anja Kruse as Erica von Baumann
 Emma Lo Bianco as Arielle
 Marco Miraglia as Duel Witness
 Jay Natelle as Prince Benedikt
 Michele Natelle as Benedikt
 Maria Pia Ruspoli as Hanna von Limburg
Jacopo Venturiero

References

External links 
 

Italian drama films
2013 films
2013 drama films